The Cabinet of the Cooperative Republic of Guyana is a principal component of the executive branch of the government of Guyana. Established by Article 106 of the Constitution of Guyana, the Cabinet consists of the President of Guyana, the Prime Minister, the Vice Presidents (if any additional Vice Presidents are appointed), and the Ministers appointed by the President. The Cabinet is tasked with aiding and advising the President as it relates to the general control and direction of the government. While the Cabinet is appointed by the President, it is also collectively responsible to Parliament.

Allocation of Ministerial Portfolios
All portfolios and areas of responsibility that would fall to the Ministers are vested in the President under Article 107 of the constitution until these portfolios are allocated by the President to the charge of a specific Minister. The President may allocate multiple Ministries to one Minister either substantively, or on an acting basis.

Current cabinet
As of November 5, 2020, the Cabinet of Guyana consists of the following members:

References 

Government of Guyana
Guyana